Puerto Rico Highway 125 (PR-125) is a road that travels from Aguadilla, Puerto Rico to San Sebastián, passing through Moca. This highway begins at PR-111 in Palmar and ends at the same highway in Piedras Blancas.

Major intersections

Related route

Highway 125 Spur (abbreviated Ramal PR-125 or PR-125R) is a road that branches off from PR-125 to PR-109 in downtown San Sebastián.

See also

 List of highways numbered 125

References

External links

 PR-125, Moca, Puerto Rico

125